Herbert Flack (29 June 1913 – 1995) was a Canadian speed skater. He competed in the men's 1500 metres event at the 1932 Winter Olympics.

References

1913 births
1995 deaths
Canadian male speed skaters
Olympic speed skaters of Canada
Speed skaters at the 1932 Winter Olympics
People from Penetanguishene